Sergei Sergeyevich Nesterenko (born 30 December 1986) is a Russian former professional football player.

Club career
He played 2 games for the main squad of FC Rubin Kazan, one in Russian Cup and another in the UEFA Intertoto Cup 2007 against Zalaegerszegi TE.

He made his Russian Football National League debut for FC SKA-Energiya Khabarovsk on 27 March 2008 in a game against FC Sportakademklub Moscow.

External links
 

1986 births
People from Altai Krai
Living people
Russian footballers
Association football defenders
FC Dynamo Barnaul players
FC Rubin Kazan players
FC SKA-Khabarovsk players
FC Tosno players
Sportspeople from Altai Krai